Hengeveld is a surname. Notable people with the surname include:

 Fred Hengeveld (1897–1969), American college sports coach
 Gerard Hengeveld (1910–2001), Dutch pianist, composer, and educationalist
 Johannes Hengeveld (1894–1961), Dutch Olympic athlete

See also
 Hengevelde